Adolfo Esteche Sosa (born July 6, 1972) is a retired Paraguayan footballer who played for clubs of Paraguay, Chile and Argentina.

Teams
  Sportivo Luqueño 1994–1998
  Olimpia 1998
  Santiago Morning 1999
  Sportivo Luqueño 2000
  Olimpia 2001
  Deportivo Recoleta 2002
  Sportivo Luqueño 2003–2004
  Sportivo Eldorado de Misiones 2005

External links
 

1972 births
Living people
Paraguayan footballers
Paraguayan expatriate footballers
Club Olimpia footballers
Sportivo Luqueño players
Santiago Morning footballers
Chilean Primera División players
Expatriate footballers in Chile
Expatriate footballers in Argentina
Association football midfielders